Kuma hé is the seventh studio album by the Belgian girlgroup K3. The album was released on 3 October 2005 through label Studio 100. Two singles were released from the album: "Kuma hé" and "Borst vooruit". Kuma hé reached the peak position in both the Flemish and Dutch album charts. In 2009, a reissue of the album was released, which contains the original songs as well as karaoke versions.

Track listing

Chart performance

Weekly charts

Year-end charts

Certifications

References

2005 albums
K3 (band) albums